John Goff Ballentine (May 20, 1825 – November 23, 1915) was an American slave owner, politician and a member of the United States House of Representatives for Tennessee's 7th congressional district and a colonel in the Confederate army.

Biography
Ballentine was born on May 20, 1825, in Pulaski, Tennessee in Giles County son of  Andrew Mitchell and Mary Tuttle Goff Ballentine. He graduated from Wurtemberg Academy in 1841, from the University of Nashville in 1845, and from the law department of Harvard University in 1848. He was a member of the faculty of Livingston Law School in New York. He commenced the practice of law in Pulaski.

Career
Ballentine moved to Panola County, Mississippi about 1854, continued the practice of law, and engaged in the extensive family agricultural pursuits. There he met and married Miss Mary E. Laird, daughter of Dr. Henry Laird of Belmont. The couple had four children.  He settled in Memphis, Tennessee in 1860. He served as a colonel in the Confederate Army during the Civil War. After the war, he returned to Pulaski, Tennessee.

Elected as a Democrat to the Forty-eighth and Forty-ninth Congresses, Ballentine served from March 4, 1883 to March 3, 1887.  He declined to be a candidate for renomination in 1886 and retired from active pursuits.

Death
Ballentine died in Pulaski, Tennessee on November 23, 1915 (age 90 years, 187 days). He is interred at the New Pulaski Cemetery.

References

External links

1825 births
1915 deaths
People from Pulaski, Tennessee
Democratic Party members of the United States House of Representatives from Tennessee
American lawyers
American slave owners
19th-century American politicians
University of Nashville alumni
Harvard Law School alumni
Confederate States Army officers
People of Tennessee in the American Civil War